G. S. Varadachary (15 October 1932 – 3 November 2022) was an Indian Telugu language film critic and journalist. He was Assistant Editor of Andhra Bhoomi till his retirement in 1988.

Life
Varadachary was born in Armoor in Nizamabad. He started his journalism career with Andhra Janata in 1948.

Varadachary was Vice President of Telugu Bhashodyama Samakhya, which fights for Telugu language usage in government. He received an honorary doctorate from Telugu University for journalism.

Varadachary died following a brief illness at the KIMS Hospital in Hyderabad, on 3 November 2022, at the age of 90.

Awards
 V R Narla Life Time Achievement Award - 2005

Bibliography
 Ilaagenaa Rayadam (2003)
 Diddubatu (2003)
 Mana Patrikeya Velugulu (2010)

References

External links
 Profile on Telugu daily

1932 births
2022 deaths
Indian male journalists
People from Nizamabad, Telangana
Telugu people